The 1998 Formula Shell Super Unleaded season was the 14th season of the franchise in the Philippine Basketball Association (PBA).

Draft picks

Notable date
February 17:  Richie Ticzon attempted a desperation three-pointer and was fouled by Boars forward Noli Locsin. He sank all three free throws to give Shell an 86-85 overtime victory over Gordon's Gin for their first win of the season after losing their first four games in the All-Filipino Cup. Victor Pablo led the Zoom Masters valiant effort with 33 points, 13 in the fourth quarter.

Occurrences
Coach Chito Narvasa has filed a leave of absence with only four games left for the Zoom Masters in the All-Filipino Cup eliminations. Assistant coach Perry Ronquillo was named interim coach and led the team to three victories but failed to advance in the next round.  

Shell's former coach Chito Narvasa has moved over to the Purefoods Tender Juicy Hotdogs as their new coach beginning the Commissioner's Cup.

Bobby Parks played two games in the Commissioner's Cup before John Best on his third stint in the PBA takes over as the Zoom Masters' import.

Shell release Estong Ballesteros to the Pangasinan Presidents in the Metropolitan Basketball Association (MBA) during the middle of the year. Shell was fined P50,000 for failing to inform the PBA office.

Championship
John Best teamed up with the streak-shooting Donald Williams for the Centennial Cup and Governors Cup tournament. Shell beat Ginebra in their semifinal playoff, 78-75 in overtime on October 4, to reach the Centennial Cup finals against Mobiline, Williams finish that game with 39 points and hitting eight triples. In a one-game championship on October 6, Shell lost to Mobiline in overtime by a point, 66-67. 

In the Governor's Cup, John Best and Donald Williams wouldn't be denied as the Zoom Masters exact revenge on the Mobiline Phone Pals, the two teams played in the finals after they knock off San Miguel Beermen and Purefoods respectively in sudden-death playoffs when all four semifinalist finish with identical 12 wins and 9 losses. Shell won over Mobiline in an exciting seven-game series by coming back from a 2-3 series deficit to win the last two games and clinch their third PBA title and the first in six years.

Roster

Transactions

Trades

Released/subtractions

Recruited imports

References

Formula
Shell Turbo Chargers seasons